Open House was an early Australian television series, which aired on Melbourne station GTV-9 from 25 August 1957 to 6 April 1958. The hour-long series aired at 4:45PM on Sundays, and was replaced on the schedule with In Melbourne Today. Like most early Australian series, the series aired in only a single city.

Presenters on the series included Jim Wood, Jane Edwards and Peter Lunn, and Hal Todd, with Gretta Miers appearing on the last few episodes. Todd and Miers continued onto In Melbourne Today.

The series was of a magazine-format, with interviews, music and guest artists.

References

External links

Nine Network original programming
1957 Australian television series debuts
1958 Australian television series endings
Australian television talk shows
Black-and-white Australian television shows
English-language television shows
Australian variety television shows